Nagaral(ನಾಗರಾಳ) is a village in the southern state of Karnataka, India. It is located in the Bilagi taluk of Bagalkot district in Karnataka. It is famous for the Digamabareshwara temple and well educated persons.

Demographics
 India census, Nagaral had a population of 3329 with 1668 males and 1661 females as per 2001 census.

See also
Bagalkot
Districts of Karnataka

References

Village code= 587116 "Census of India: Villages with population 5000 & above". Registrar General & Census Commissioner, India. Archived from the original on 8 December 2008. Retrieved 18 December 2008.

"Yahoomaps India: Nagaral, Bagalkot, Karnataka". Archived from the original on 18 December 2008. Retrieved 18 December 2008.

External links

Villages in Bagalkot district